is a railway station on the Osaka Metro Yotsubashi Line in Nishi-ku, Osaka, Japan.

History
October 1, 1965 - The station opened, because the section of the Yotsubashi Line from Daikokucho to Nishi-Umeda was opened.

Lines
Osaka Metro
Yotsubashi Line (Station number: Y14)

Yotsubashi Station is treated as the same station as Shinsaibashi Station for the purpose of fare calculation. Shinsaibashi Station is served by the following lines:
 (M19)
 (N15)

Layout
This station has an island platform serving two tracks on the second basement in the west of Shinsaibashi Station on the Nagahori Tsurumi-ryokuchi Line.

Surroundings
Amerikamura
Crysta Nagahori
Horie
Osaka School of Music
Orix Theater

External links

References

Osaka Metro stations
Railway stations in Japan opened in 1965